Samson and the Sea Beast (also known as Samson Against the Pirates) is a 1963 Italian peplum film directed by Tanio Boccia.

The plot centres around a pirate terrorising the Antilles. He plunders ships, slaughtering their crews and selling women as slaves. One of the women asks a man named Sansone for help battling the pirates.

Cast 

 Kirk Morris: Samson 
 Margaret Lee: Amanda 
 Daniele Vargas: Murad 
 Aldo Bufi Landi: Manuel 
 Tullio Altamura: Mobed 
 Adriana Ambesi: Sarah 
 Attilio Dottesio: Alvarez 
 Calisto Calisti: Ibrahim  
 Nello Pazzafini: Sandor

Release
Samson Against the Pirates was released in Italy on 29 July 1963. It was also released as Samson and the Sea Beasts.

References

Bibliography

External links

1963 films
1963 adventure films
Films directed by Tanio Boccia
Peplum films
Pirate films
Films scored by Angelo Francesco Lavagnino
Sword and sandal films
1960s Italian films